Cambamba is a village, as well as the name of a commune in Angola. It is situated in the Uíge Province.

References

Populated places in Uíge Province